The Bridge or Al-Jisr is a Yemeni short story collection by Zayd Mutee' Dammaj. It was first published in 1986.

References

Books by Zayd Mutee' Dammaj
1986 short story collections
Yemeni short story collections